Temwa Chawinga (born 20 September 1998) is a Malawian footballer who plays as a forward for Chinese club Wuhan Jianghan University FC and the Malawi women's national team.

Honours 
Wuhan Jianghan University

 Chinese Women's Super League: 2020

International goals
Scores and results list Malawi's goal tally first

Personal life
Chawinga's sister Tabitha is also a Malawian international footballer.

References

Living people
Malawian women's footballers
Women's association football forwards
Damallsvenskan players
Kvarnsvedens IK players
Malawi women's international footballers
Malawian expatriate footballers
Malawian expatriate sportspeople in Sweden
Expatriate women's footballers in Sweden
1998 births
Malawian expatriate sportspeople in China
Expatriate women's footballers in China